John Larsen (1913–1989) was a Norwegian rifle shooter and Olympic gold medalist.

John Larsen may also refer to:

John Larsen (footballer) (born 1962), Danish former footballer 
John Larsen (rower) (born 1943), Canadian Olympic rower
John H. Larsen Jr. (born 1943), Norwegian sports shooter, son of the Olympic medalist

See also
Jon Larsen (disambiguation)
John Larson (disambiguation)